Leptophlebia is a genus of mayflies in the family Leptophlebiidae.

Species
Leptophlebia bradleyi
Leptophlebia cupida – Early brown spinner
Leptophlebia duplex
Leptophlebia intermedia
Leptophlebia johnsoni
Leptophlebia konza
Leptophlebia marginata – Sepia dun
Leptophlebia nebulosa
Leptophlebia pacifica
Leptophlebia simplex
Leptophlebia vespertina – Claret dun
Leptophlebia wui

References

Mayfly genera
Leptophlebiidae
Taxa named by John O. Westwood